1953 in the Philippines details events of note that happened in the Philippines in the year 1953

Incumbents

 President:
Elpidio Quirino (Liberal) (until December 30)
Ramon Magsaysay (Nacionalista Party) (starting December 30)
 Vice President:
Fernando Lopez (Liberal) (until December 30)
Carlos P. Garcia (Nacionalista Party) (starting December 30)
 Chief Justice: Ricardo Paras 
 Congress: 2nd (until December 8)

Events

June
 June 12 – Tacloban becomes a city in the province of Leyte through Republic Act 760.

November
 November 10 – Ramon Magsaysay is elected president in the presidential elections.

December
 December 30 – Magsaysay takes his oath of office.

Holidays

As per Act No. 2711 section 29, issued on March 10, 1917, any legal holiday of fixed date falls on Sunday, the next succeeding day shall be observed as legal holiday. Sundays are also considered legal religious holidays. Bonifacio Day was added through Philippine Legislature Act No. 2946. It was signed by then-Governor General Francis Burton Harrison in 1921. On October 28, 1931, the Act No. 3827 was approved declaring the last Sunday of August as National Heroes Day.

 January 1 – New Year's Day
 February 22 – Legal Holiday
 April 2 – Maundy Thursday
 April 3 – Good Friday
 May 1 – Labor Day
 July 4 – Philippine Republic Day
 August 13  – Legal Holiday
 August 30  – National Heroes Day
 November 26 – Thanksgiving Day
 November 30 – Bonifacio Day
 December 25 – Christmas Day
 December 30 – Rizal Day

Entertainment and culture
 October 23 – The Philippines' DZAQ-TV 3 of Alto Broadcasting System (now ABS-CBN) makes its initial telecast, becoming Asia's first commercial television broadcaster.

Births

 January 5 – Tony Tan Caktiong, Filipino entrepreneur
 January 7 – Flor Contemplacion, Filipino domestic worker executed in Singapore (d. 1995)
 January 27 – Dinky Soliman, politician and Secretary of DSWD (d. 2021)

 February 13 – Rico J. Puno, singer and politician (d. 2018)

 March 14 – Leonard Mayaen, governor of Mountain Province (d. 2016)
 March 28 – Herminio Coloma Jr.,  Secretary of the Presidential Communications Operations Office

 April 1 – Tirso Cruz III, Filipino actor and singer 
 April 10 – William Dar, horticulturist and public servant
 April 20 – Cielito Habito, economist, professor, and columnist

 May 21 – Nora Aunor, Filipina actress
 May 24 – Ricardo Manapat, author and director of National Archives (d. 2008)
 May 27 – Coney Reyes, Filipina actress and host
 May 29 – Wendel Avisado, Secretary of Budget and Management

 August 10 – Menggie Cobarrubias, actor (d. 2020)
 August 11 – Cory Quirino, Filipino author, host, and national director of Miss World Philippines
 August 22 – Phillip Salvador, Filipino Actor and Former Action Star Role

 September 13 – Rufus Rodriguez, Filipino legal scholar and politician
 September 14 – Freddie Hubalde, basketball player
 September 15 – Margarita Moran-Floirendo, Miss Universe 1973
 September 20 – Roi Vinzon, Filipino action star

 October 3 – Ramon Fernandez, basketball player

 November 5 – Florentino Floro, lawyer and judge
 November 11 – Narciso Villaver Abellana, Filipino Roman Catholic bishop
 November 20 – Bembol Roco, actor

 December 16 – Emmanuel Piñol, journalist, writer, agriculturist and politician
 December 27 – Gina Lopez, environmentalist, former DENR secretary (2016–2017), former chairperson of ABS-CBN Foundation (d. 2019)

Death

References